Pukarani (Aymara pukara fortress or a mountain of protection, -ni a suffix to indicate ownership, "the one with a fortress", Hispanicized spelling Pucarani) is a mountain with an archaeological site of the same name in the Andes of Peru, about  high. It is located in the Puno Region, Lampa Province, Nicasio District.

The archaeological site of Pukarani was declared a National Cultural Heritage by Resolución Directoral Nacional No. 79. It lies north of the mountain and archaeological site of Intikancha.

References

Mountains of Peru
Mountains of Puno Region
Archaeological sites in Peru
Archaeological sites in Puno Region